Kuntur Ikiña (Aymara kunturi condor, ikiña to sleep, 'where the condor sleeps', also spelled Condor Iquiña) is a  mountain in the Bolivian Andes. It is located in the Cochabamba Department, Tapacari Province. Kuntur Ikiña lies southwest of Jach'a Ch'utu.

References 

Mountains of Cochabamba Department